The Clavicipitaceae are a family of fungi within the order Hypocreales. A 2008 estimate placed 43 genera in the family, but a study in 2020 has increased this number to 50.

Phylogeny

Molecular phylogenetic analysis of multigene DNA sequence data indicates the taxon Clavicipitaceae is paraphyletic, and consists of three well-defined clades, at least one of which is shared with members of another fungal family (Hypocreaceae). The evolution within the Clavicipitaceae is marked by interkingdom host jumping, and the range of this large and heterogeneous fungal group spans mutualistic plant symbionts, as well as parasites of plants, insects, and other fungi.

Significance
Many of its members produce alkaloids toxic to animals and humans. One of its most infamous species is Claviceps purpurea, which has historical significance as the cause of St. Anthony's fire, also known as ergotism. Ergotism is caused by ergot alkaloids, such as ergotamine and ergocristine, which are chemical derivatives of lysergic acid. Metarhizium species are widely used in the biological control of insect pests.

Genera
Several genera, especially those previously described as "anamorphic" (having no known sexual cycle) are now re-classified into other families, in light of current molecular and other evidence. Mycobank currently (July 2018) lists the following genera in this family. With additions (including no. of species) from Wijayawardene et al. 2020.

 Aciculosporium  (4)
 Akrophyton 
 Aschersonia  (170+)
 Atkinsonella  (2)
 Atricordyceps 
 Balansia  (49)
 Balansiella 
 Balansiopsis 
 Barya
 Baryella
 Belaina
 Berkelella
 Blistum
 Byssostilbe
 Campylothecium
 Cavimalum  (2)
 Cepsiclava

 Chromostylium
 Claviceps  (111)
 Collarina  (1)
 Commelinaceomyces  (4)
 Conoideocrella  (3)
 Corallocytostroma  (2)
 Cordycepioideus
 Cordylia
 Corynesphaera
 Diheterospora
 Dothichloë
 Drechmeria
 Dussiella  (3)
 Echinodothis
 Ephelis  (4)
 Epichloë  (75)
 Epicrea  (1)
 Ergotaetia
 Fleischeria
 Harposporium
 Helicocollum  (3)
 Helminthascus  (1)
 Heteroepichloe  (2)
 Hypocrella
 Hypocreophis
 Hypoxylum
 Keithomyces  (3)
 Kentrosporium
 Konradia  (2)
 Linearistroma
 Loculistroma  (1)
 Marquandomyces  (1)

 Metapochonia  (6)
 Metarhiziopsis  (1)
 Metarhizium  (78) (includes Chamaeleomyces, Metacordyceps, Spatafora, Nomuraea and Stereocrea)
 Mitosporium
 Mitrasphaera
 Moelleria (fungus)
 Moelleriella  (57)
 Mothesia
 Mycomalus  (1)
 Mycophilomyces (1)
 Myriogenis
 Myriogenospora (4)
 Neobarya (12)
 Neoclaviceps
 Neocordyceps (1)
 Neotyphodium
 Nigelia (2)
 Nigrocornus (1)

 Ophiodothis
 Orbiocrella (1)
 Palaeoclaviceps
 Papiliomyces  (2)
 Parepichloë (4)
 Periglandula (2)
 Petchia (2)
 Phytocordyceps
 Pochonia (4)
 Podocrella
 Polistophthora
 Polynema (fungus)
 Polyrhina
 Pseudomeria (1)
 Purpureomyces (3)
 Racemella
 Regiocrella (2)
 Romanoa (fungus) (1)
 Rotiferophthora (27)
 Samuelsia (6)
 Shimizuomyces (2)
 Spermoedia
 Sphacelia
 Sphaceliopsis
 Sphaerocordyceps (2)

 Sungia (1)
 Tettigorhyza
 Torrubia
 Typhodium
 Tyrannicordyceps (5)
 Underwoodina
 Ustilaginula
 Ustilaginoidea (19)
 Ustilagopsis
 Villosiclava
 Wakefieldiomyces
 Xylariopsis (fungus)
 Yosiokobayasia (1)

References

Other sources
C.J. Alexopolous, Charles W. Mims, M. Blackwell  et al., Introductory Mycology, 4th ed. (John Wiley and Sons, Hoboken NJ, 2004)

External links
 

 
Ascomycota families
Taxa named by Gustav Lindau